The 2009–10 Hong Kong FA Cup was the 36th season of Hong Kong FA Cup and was played as a knockout competition for all the teams of Hong Kong First Division League in the 2009–10 season. The first round matches were played on 7 March 2010, and the final was competed on 29 May 2010.

TSW Pegasus won its first FA Cup title, and qualified for the 2011 AFC Cup as South China won both the 2009–10 Hong Kong First Division League and the 2009–10 Hong Kong Senior Challenge Shield.

Calendar

Teams

Bracket

First round

Quarter-finals

Semi-finals

Final

Scorers
The scorers in the 2009–10 Hong Kong FA Cup are as follows:

4 goals
 Itaparica (TSW Pegasus)
 Paulinho Piracicaba (Citizen)

2 goals
 Detinho (Citizen)
 Sham Kwok Keung (Shatin)
 So Loi Keung (NT Realty Wofoo Tai Po)
 Mario Nascimento (TSW Pegasus)
 Li Ling Fung (TSW Pegasus)

1 goal
 Fan Weijun (Fourway Rangers)

1 goal
 Guy Junior Ondoua (Fourway Rangers)
 Yaw Anane (Happy Valley)
 To Hon To (NT Realty Wofoo Tai Po)
 Edson Minga (Kitchee)
 Lam Ka Wai (Kitchee)
 Chu Siu Kei (Shatin)
 Takashi Fujii (Sun Hei)
 Lau Nim Yat (TSW Pegasus)
 Lee Hong Lim (TSW Pegasus)
 Li Zhixing (TSW Pegasus)

References

2009-2010 Hong Kong FA Cup, Hong Kong Football Association

2009-10
2009–10 in Hong Kong football
2010 domestic association football cups